Gavin King, better known by his stage name Aphrodite, is a British jungle and drum and bass DJ/producer on the Urban Takeover label. Also known as A Zone or DJ Aphro, he contributed to and influenced the genre's styles and techniques. He was born in Aberystwyth, Wales, and moved to London with his family as a toddler. He has studied computer science. He was one half of breakbeat hardcore group Urban Shakedown (with Claudio Giussani) who scored a UK top 40 hit with "Some Justice". The duo appeared in an article of Amiga Format magazine after using two Amiga 500 computers to help create the track.

DJ Aphrodite is behind Aphrodite Recordings which was inspired by a club he ran in 1988 called 'Aphrodite'. His debut album was a self-titled effort under V2 Recordings, released in 1999. The follow-up was Aftershock which was again released under V2 Recordings on 24 June 2002.

Discography

Albums
 Aphrodite - Recordings (Yellow cover) (1997)
 Aphrodite (1999)
 Aftershock (2002)
 Break in Reality (2007)

CD mixes
 Urban Jungle (1999)
 Aph44 (2003)
 Urban Junglist (2003)
 Urbanthology Volume 1 (2005)
 Overdrive (2005)

CDs
 See Thru It (2004)

Compilations
 Park Rave Madness (1998)
 The Takeover Bid: Round 1 (1998)
 Egil Music Presents: Urban Jungle (1999)

Singles and EPs
 1996 "Bad Ass" (with Micky Finn)
 1999 "BM Funkster"
 2002 "All Over Me" (feat. Barrington Levy) - UK #76
 2002 "See Thru It" (feat. Wildflower) - UK #68
 2003 "Bad Ass (Reissue)" (with Micky Finn)
 2003 "Rinsing Quince"
 2003 "Let the Rhythm Flow / Stalker"
 2003 "Cool Flight"
 2003 "Music's Hypnotizing / King of the Beats"
 2003 "Mash Up Ya Know"
 2003 "Def Jammer"
 2003 "Cocaine / Calling the People"
 2004 "Fanfare / Karma Sutra"

See also
Drum and bass
Jungle music
Bass music

References

External links
 
 

British drum and bass musicians
Breakbeat hardcore musicians
British DJs
British record producers
Living people
Electronic dance music DJs
People from Aberystwyth
DJs from London
Year of birth missing (living people)